Carlton Chambers (born June 27, 1975) is a retired sprint athlete from Canada, and a winner of gold medal in 4 × 100 m relay at the 1996 Summer Olympics. He ran in the preliminary heats, however a groin injury prevented him from running in the final race which was won by Robert Esmie, Glenroy Gilbert, Bruny Surin, and Donovan Bailey. He had a personal best of 10.19 in the 100 metres.

Early career

Chambers first started track when he entered grade nine at Malton's Ascension of our Lord Catholic Secondary School in September 1990. Born in June 1975, he was 15 years old as of Sept 1 of that year and competed as a junior, where most 15-year-olds compete in the younger midget boy category. With little coaching or training Chambers ran to a 10.84 and a silver medal in the 100m at the O.F.S.A.A. (Ontario Federation of Schools Athletic Association) in June of '91. The race finished with the first five junior boys within 0.02 seconds of each other.

That year Mark Guthrie of the Brampton Track Club approached the 5'6" sprinter and suggested that he join the club. Chambers didn't show up to most of the practices until May of the following year - 1992. That year going into O.F.S.A.A., Chambers relied on his natural ability rather than his training preparation. He won the junior boys 100m in 10.99 and Guthrie knew he had a star on his hands.

From then on Chambers trained more regularly and enjoyed quite a lot of success at O.T.F.A. (Ontario Track and Field Association) meets. At the beginning of the '93 high school track season Chambers was preparing himself with Guthrie for the first of three possible senior boys 100's, as he was only in grade 11 at this time. But the Catholic separate school board had a "work to rule" strike and as a result Chambers' school did not send athletes to O.F.S.A.A.

The following indoor season Chambers trained intently and won a 60m Gold medal at the York University high school Track and Field invitational. Chambers ran a hand-timed 10.2 at the city track meet (ROPSSAA) and he went to the O.F.S.A.A. ranked #1 in the province. There the 100m record had once been set at 10.55 by Yorkdale S.S.'s Ben Johnson and was later broken by Sudbury LaSalle's Robert Esmie when he ran 10.50 in 1991. In the qualifying heat, Carlton ran to a legal, non wind-aided, time of 10.41 seconds. In the final, Eric Frempong of Martingrove C.I. ran a wind-aided 10.36 to win Bronze, and Dave Tomlin of Grand River ran 10.30 for Silver. Carlton Chambers then claimed the O.F.S.A.A. Gold with his 10.27w time.

NCAA

After his time in the O.F.S.A.A. Chambers signed on at Clemson University with a full track scholarship.

The summer of 1994 saw Chambers win a Silver medal at the Canadian Juniors behind defending champion Frempong. This qualified him for the World Juniors in Portugal. There he ran a new Canadian Junior record, breaking Desai Williams' 16-year-old 10.32 with a 10.30, 5th-place finish. Chambers got his first international relay experience as the Canadian Junior 4 × 100 m team of Chambers, Frempong, Dave Tomlin and Chris Robinson won Bronze in 39.90. That same summer he was selected to run the third leg of the Commonwealth 4 × 100 m relay where he handed the baton off to Bruny Surin who ran it in for Gold.

After two years at Clemson, Carlton went to the 1996 NCAA championships and ran to a fourth place in the 100m with a time of 10.19. Ato Boldon of UCLA won the race and later went to the 1996 Olympic Games and ran a 9.90 100m in Atlanta to win bronze.

1996 Olympics

In Atlanta, Chambers ran the heats in the  4 × 100 m relay. In the final Chambers was replaced by Robert Esmie, who lead off the relay. Canada won the gold medal in 37.69 seconds, defeating the United States and establishing a national record in the event. Chambers had suffered a groin injury running the 200m, and the switch with Esmie was made.

In 2008, Carlton Chambers, along with his 4 × 100 m relay teammates from the 1996 Atlanta Olympics were inducted into the Canadian Sports Hall of Fame.

References

External links
 
 
 
 
 
 
 Olympic gold medallist still golden as a coach

1975 births
Living people
Canadian male sprinters
Olympic track and field athletes of Canada
Commonwealth Games medallists in athletics
Athletes (track and field) at the 1996 Summer Olympics
Commonwealth Games gold medallists for Canada
Athletes (track and field) at the 1994 Commonwealth Games
Black Canadian track and field athletes
Track and field athletes from Ontario
Olympic gold medalists for Canada
Clemson Tigers men's track and field athletes
Medalists at the 1996 Summer Olympics
Olympic gold medalists in athletics (track and field)
World Athletics Championships athletes for Canada
World Athletics Championships winners
Medallists at the 1994 Commonwealth Games